Julia Hardin was an All-American Girls Professional Baseball League player.

According to All American League data, Julia Hardin played at third base for the Grand Rapids Chicks during the 1946 season. Nevertheless, additional information is incomplete because there are no records available at the time of the request.

The All-American Girls Professional Baseball League folded in 1954, but there is a permanent display at the Baseball Hall of Fame and Museum at Cooperstown, New York since 1988 that honors the entire league rather than any individual figure.

References

All-American Girls Professional Baseball League players
Grand Rapids Chicks players
Baseball players from Georgia (U.S. state)
People from Heard County, Georgia
Date of birth missing
Possibly living people
Year of birth missing